Pekka ja Pätkä Suezilla (Swedish: Träskalle och Stumpen i Suez , English: Pekka and Pätkä on Suez) is a 1958 Finnish comedy directed by Armand Lohikoski and starring Esa Pakarinen and Masa Niemi. It is the tenth movie in the Pekka ja Pätkä-series of musical buddy comedies based on the Finnish comic book.

Summary
The movie begins with the final scene of the previous film Pekka ja Pätkä Sammakkomiehinä where the two main protagonists are knocked out by a pair of Finnish soldiers. The soldiers take Pekka and Pätkä's clothes, put them in uniform and drag them to the plane for Suez where a Finnish platoon is being sent on a peace keeping mission.

Pekka and Pätkä are unwittingly captured by bandits, rescue Caliphe Abu Kapi's daughter Sulema and uncover a plot for a revolution being planned by sheik Ali Ben Ali.

Notes
 The movie is a direct sequel to Pekka ja Pätkä Sammakkomiehinä (1957) and the movie begins with the final scene of this film explaining how Pekka and Pätkä end up on the plane to Suez.
 The film's setting was inspired by the real Suez Crisis in 1956.
 Due to the film's exotic location the series' other regular characters, Pekka's wife Justiina (Siiri Angerkoski) and caretaker Pikkarainen (Armas Jokio) only appear briefly towards the end of the film.
 The film features an early appearance by Spede Pasanen

1958 films
Finnish comedy films
Films set in Egypt
Buddy comedy films
Live-action films based on comics